The Teacher's Diary is a 2014 Thai drama film directed by Nithiwat Tharathorn. It was selected as the Thai entry for the Best Foreign Language Film at the 87th Academy Awards, but was not nominated. The film was remade in Hindi as Notebook, released in March 2019.

Story
An out of work male teacher accepts an offer to teach in a remote school based on a run down houseboat. There he read a diary left behind by the previous year's teacher - a woman banished from her city school for refusing to remove her tattoo. He becomes attracted to the writer and writes comments in the diary. When he leaves and she returns, she reads his comments and a mutual regard develops.

Cast
 Laila Boonyasak as Ann  
 Sukrit Wisetkaew as Song  
 Sukollawat Kanarot as Nui  
 Chutima Teepanat as Nam  
 Witawat Singlampong as Nam's New Boyfriend

See also
 List of submissions to the 87th Academy Awards for Best Foreign Language Film
 List of Thai submissions for the Academy Award for Best Foreign Language Film

References

External links
 

2014 films
2014 drama films
Thai drama films
Thai-language films
GMM Tai Hub films
Thai films remade in other languages